Mildred Coles (9 April 1876 – 24 February 1937) was a British tennis player. She was a two time quarter finalist in singles at the 1911 Wimbledon Championships and 1913 Wimbledon Championships.

Career
Mildred Coles was born 9 April 1876 in Cranbrook, Kent, England. Her tennis career began in 1902. In 1905 she reached the final of the Belgian Championships where she shared the title with Mabel Squire. She competed in the women's singles event at the 1908 Summer Olympics. She competed at the Wimbledon Championships twelve times between 1905 and 1927, where she reached the quarter finals in the singles events in 1911 and 1913. 

Her other singles career highlights included; winning the Rochester Open at Rochester, Kent six times (1904–07, 1922, 1934).

Coles also won the Mid-Kent Championships at Maidstone four time (1903-04, 1911, 1914). Additionally she also won titles at Hythe (1922), Margate, (1924), Herne Bay (1924–25) and  Chatham (1927). She was also a losing finalist at Reading (1924) and Wentworth (1926). She was active until 1927.

References

External links
 Wimbledon: Player Profile: Mildred Coles

1876 births
1937 deaths
British female tennis players
Olympic tennis players of Great Britain
Tennis players at the 1908 Summer Olympics
Tennis people from Kent